Living Together is a 2011 Malayalam supernatural romance film written and directed by Fazil. The cast is all new faces. The lead roles have been played by Hemanth Menon and Sshivada.  Menaka Suresh made her 24-year long comeback through this film in Mollywood industry. The film features a musical score by C. Rajamani and songs by M. Jayachandran.

Plot
Shyama is a free-spirited girl who lost her parents at a young age. After their death, she becomes attached to her grandfather and uncle. She was brought up in a progressive way and, unlike typical Kerala women, used to mingle freely with boys. She becomes friendly with Hemachandran, a boy in the neighbourhood who falls in love with her. However, she moves away from the locality. Later, Hemaachandran discovers Shyama does love him. However, Shyama is not willing for a marriage as she is told that either she or Hemachandran will die after six months from the marriage. The story continues to tell how they overcome this obstacle in their relationship and family problems.

Cast
 Hemanth Menon as Hemachandran
 Sshivada as Shyama
 Sreejith Vijay as Niranjan, Hemachandran's friend
 Jinoop as Bavappan, Hemachandran's friend
 Nedumudi Venu as Vasudevan Kartha, Shyama's grandfather
 Menaka Suresh Kumar  as Valsala, Hemachandran's mother
 Innocent as Krishnaprasad Kartha, Shyama's uncle.
 Bindu Panicker as Vasanthi, Krishnaprasad's wife
 Anoop Chandran as Manikantan, an adopted family member.
 Lakshmipriya as Manikantan's wife
 Darshak Sundar as Neighbour
 Irfan Ziraj as Neighbour

Soundtrack
The film features a musical score by C. Rajamani and songs by M. Jayachandran. The lyrics are written by Kaithapram Damodaran Namboothiri.

References

External links
 "Bold and beautiful". The Hindu. Retrieved 2011-02-18.
 Rediff review

2011 films
2010s Malayalam-language films
Films scored by M. Jayachandran
Supernatural romantic films